"Selling the Drama" is the first single from Live's 1994 album, Throwing Copper. It reached number one on the US Billboard Modern Rock Tracks chart, becoming their first of three singles to reach the top of this chart. The song also reached number 43 on the Billboard Hot 100, number 49 in Australia, number 41 in Canada and number 30 in the United Kingdom. It achieved its highest peak in the Netherlands, peaking at number 15 on both the Dutch Top 40 and Single Top 100 charts. Live's performance of "Selling the Drama" at Woodstock '94 was their featured song on the Woodstock 94 double album.

Music video
The video is set in a wooded area and filmed in both black and white and in color, showing the band playing the song and lead singer Ed Kowalczyk tearing pages out of a book. The video is notable for one of the last appearances of Kowalczyk's long hair, which he shaved off around the time that "I Alone" was released as a single.

Track listings
All songs were written by Live.

US cassette
 "Selling the Drama" – 3:26
 "Lightning Crashes" – 5:25

Australian CD
 "Selling the Drama" – 3:26
 "The Dam at Otter Creek" – 4:40
 "Shit Towne" – 3:48

UK CD and cassette
 "Selling the Drama" – 3:27
 "Selling the Drama" (acoustic) – 3:40
 "White, Discussion" – 4:39

UK CD
 "Selling the Drama" – 3:26
 "I Alone" (bootleg) – 4:23
 "Operation Spirit (The Tyranny of Tradition)" (bootleg) – 4:53

UK and European CD
 "Selling the Drama" – 3:26
 "The Dam at Otter Creek" (bootleg) – 5:35
 "Selling the Drama" (bootleg) – 3:35

UK cassette
 "Selling the Drama" – 3:25
 "The Dam at Otter Creek" (Bootleg) – 3:35

French CD
 "Selling the Drama" – 3:27
 "Selling the Drama" (acoustic) – 3:38

German CD (RAD 31974)
 "Selling the Drama" – 3:27
 "Selling the Drama" (acoustic) – 3:40
 "White, Discussion" (special radio edit) – 4:40

German CD (RAD 32228)
 "Selling the Drama" – 3:27
 "Selling the Drama" (acoustic) – 3:38

Charts

Release history

References

External links
 Official website
 "Selling The Drama" music video via YouTube

Live (band) songs
1994 singles
Songs written by Ed Kowalczyk
Song recordings produced by Jerry Harrison
1994 songs
Radioactive Records singles